Jessica von Bredow-Werndl (born 16 February 1986 in Rosenheim) is a German Olympic dressage rider.

Von Bredow-Werndl has qualified for the 2014 Dressage World Cup Final in Lyon after finishing fourth in the Western European League rankings. She won the Western European League qualifying stage in Gothenburg during the 2013/2014 season. At the finals held in Lyon's expo center she finished seventh.

Von Bredow-Werndl also competed at the following World Cup finals in 2015 in Las Vegas, Nevada. This time she finished third, getting a podium, scoring above 80%. Von Bredow-Werndl successfully defended her third-place finish at the next edition of World Cup Final in 2016.

She was selected to be a part of German team at the 2015 European Dressage Championships where she won a bronze medal in team competition and finished seventh in the freestyle competition.

Jessica became the individual Olympic Champion during the 2020 Summer Olympics in Tokyo with her mare Dalera, scoring 91.732% in the individual freestyle. She also earned the golden team medal with Isabell Werth and Dorothee Schneider.

International Championship Results

About Jessica
Jessica had her first riding lesson when she was four and that was the spark she needed to ignite her lifelong passion. At that time her brother Benjamin was 6. He also has been hooked in the riding experience and to this day, they would rather stay in the stables with the horses than anywhere in the world.

Jessica received her first horse at the age of seven. The horse her parents gave her was called "Little girl" and she was a Lewitzer pony. For Jessica this horse was a thousand times more interesting than all the Barbies in the world. To help with her and Benjamin's desire, to learn riding, there was always Paul Elzenbaumer, their first trainer. From 1995 to 2007, Stephan Münch was there to help them proceed from E level to Grand Prix. For Jessica those eleven years were incredibly rich with learning, fun and excitement.

In 1998 and 1999 Jessica and her new horse "Nino the Champ" qualified for the finals at the German "Bundeschampion" in Warendorf. That was the first time she felt what it meant to ride in a big championship. Most people would leave, the championship, nervous, but not Jessica. The feeling she had while performing made her want to compete even further.
After she transitioned to riding big horses, while at the age 15, she qualified for the top three straightway. This took place at the "Preis der Besten" in Waredorf, she competed with a horse called Nokturn. While at the second qualification for the European Championships, she was so nervous that she rode the wrong way twice, hence she finished twelfth. It was then when she realised how important it is to have good nerves. Since then she regularly practiced mental training, breathing and concentration practices were also important.

One year later (2002) her dream to go to the European championships came true. Bonito and Duchess helped her achieve six gold and two silver medals in just three years. In that time she also managed to win three German national titles. In 2006 she had worked up to the Grand Prix level.

Jessica and Benjamin were dedicated to establish themselves in the Grand Prix level with the young horses that they trained themselves. Along their journey they were assisted with the essential tips by Isabell Werth. In the five years that she was assisting them, she brought them together with Jonny Hilberath. They have been working with him since 2011. They also had the advantage of ongoing training sessions with Andreas Hausberger, one of the head riders of the Spanish riding school in Vienna.

For Jessica motivating young horses and supporting them in their development is a big source of joy. But it is even nicer when the horses give something back and they find success together.

In 2012, Unee, a handsome black stallion, owned by Beatrice Bürchler-Keller, came into her life. They soon became a team and have developed significantly since their first success in the regional tournaments. Since then they made their way into the International scene and have begun to be noticed. 
Jessica claims that there is always room for improvement and that she is excited to see how far she and her team can push themselves. She is also very grateful for what she has and that she can spend everyday doing what she loves the most: living with horses, learning from them and having fun together. Source.

References

1986 births
Living people
German dressage riders
Equestrians at the 2020 Summer Olympics
Olympic equestrians of Germany
German female equestrians
Olympic medalists in equestrian
Medalists at the 2020 Summer Olympics
Olympic gold medalists for Germany